Evodinus clathratus is a species of beetles in the family Cerambycidae.

Distribution and habitat
This species is present in most of Europe and in Russia.

Description
These beetles have a narrow black head. The black pronotum is narrow, rough and strongly punctuated. The elytra are black with reddish yellowish dots on the base. The legs are typically partially reddish, though it is an extremely variable species in terms of markings on the elytra and in coloring of the legs.

Biology
The life cycle of these beetles is two to three years. Adults can be found from May to July. They frequently feed on nectar of Aruncus vulgaris. The larvae are polyphagous in coniferous trees. They develop in decayed branches and trunks of spruce (especially Picea abies), beech, willow, and alder.

References

 Fabricius Johann Christian (1801) Systema eleutheratorum secundum ordines, genera, species : adiectis synonymis, locis, observationibus, descriptionibus, Bibliopoli Academici Novi, Kiliae 2: 1–687.
 Hoffmann Adolphe (1909) Coleopterologische Sammelreise nach Kärnten. (Schluß.), Entomologische Blätter, Nürnberg 5 (7): 150–153.
 Zimsen Ella (1964) The type material of I. C. Fabricius., Copenhagen, Munksgaard 656 pp.
Goggi Gianpietro (2006) Indagine faunistica sui Cerambicidi (Coleoptera, Cerambycidae) della Valsassina (Lecco, Lombardia), Giornale Italiano di Entomologia, Cremona 11: 315–323.

Lepturinae